This is a list of active power stations in Queensland, Australia. Candidates for this list must already be commissioned and capable of generating 1 MW or more of electricity. Queensland has a diverse range of
power generating types.

Coal fired 

These fossil fuel power stations burn coal to power steam turbines that generate some or all of the electricity they produce.

 Gladstone scheduled for closure in 2035.
 Tarong scheduled for closure in 2036.
 Callide B scheduled for closure in 2028.
 Stanwell scheduled for closure in 2046.

Gas turbine  

These gas turbine power stations use gas combustion to generate some or all of the electricity they produce. Combined cycle plants include an Open Cycle Gas Turbine, plus a Heat Recovery Steam Generator that uses waste heat from the gas turbine to make steam to drive a Steam Turbine.

Gas (reciprocating) 

These power stations use gas combustion in reciprocating engines to generate some or all of the electricity they produce.

Hydroelectric 

These hydroelectric power stations use the flow of water to generate some or all of the electricity they produce.

Wind farms 

These Wind Farms use the power of wind to turn wind turbines to generate all of the electricity they produce.

Solar 

These power stations convert light into electricity using the photovoltaic effect.

Biomass combustion 

These power stations burn biomass (biofuel) to generate some or all of the electricity they produce.

See also 

Energy in Queensland
History of electricity supply in Queensland
List of power stations in Australia

References

External links 
List of Green Power approved generators (pdf)
Australian Business Council for Sustainable Energy
BCSE Renewable Energy Power Plant Register 2006 (pdf)
Renewable Energy Credit registry
Map of Power Station Locations in the NEM
Energy Developments Limited Remote Area Energy

Queensland, active
 
Power stations
Power stations